Ernest George Bock (17 September 1908 – 5 September 1961) was a South African cricketer who played in one Test in 1935.

Bock was born in Kimberley, South Africa.  He was a lower-order right-handed batsman and a right-arm medium pace bowler who played only two full seasons of first-class cricket in South Africa, one for Griqualand West and one for Transvaal. Only a couple of times did he achieve distinction. For Griqualand West against Rhodesia in 1931–32, batting at number 9, he scored 78. In 1934–35, in the final match of the season for Transvaal against Orange Free State he took five wickets for eight runs as the Free State side were bowled out for 70.

After that bowling performance, he only appeared in three further first-class games. The first of those was the second Test against Australia at Johannesburg in 1935–36, when he batted at number 11 in both innings, scoring 9 and 2, both times not out, and he failed to take a wicket in 23 overs. That was his only match that season and he then disappeared from cricket for four years until two final matches for North Eastern Transvaal in 1939–40.  He died in Springs, Gauteng.

References

1908 births
1961 deaths
Cricketers from Kimberley, Northern Cape
South Africa Test cricketers
South African cricketers
Griqualand West cricketers
Northerns cricketers
Gauteng cricketers